"Redrum" (stylized as "redruM"; palindrome for "Murder") is a song by Romanian singer and songwriter Sorana and French disc jockey David Guetta. It was released for digital download and streaming on 20 January 2022 by Atlantic Records. The song was written by Sorana and 15 others, including Jeffrey Bhasker, Mikkel Cox, Guetta, Malik Jones, Mr Hudson, Scott Mescudi, Giorgio Tuinfort, Kanye West and Ernest Wilson, while the production was handled by Toby Green, Guetta and Cox. A dance-pop track about a love triangle and a resulting heartbreak, it interpolates the refrain of West's 2008 song "Heartless".

Music critics gave positive reviews of "Redrum" upon its release, praising the catchiness, Sorana's vocal delivery and the production. Commercially, the song reached number ten in Bulgaria and the top 20 in the Commonwealth of Independent States (CIS), Russia and the Netherlands. An accompanying music video was uploaded to Guetta's YouTube channel simultaneously with the single release. Directed by Andra Marta, Alexandru Mureșan and Cristina Poszet, it portrays Sorana being chased by a clone of herself through the hallways of a hotel. Observers likened the visual and the singer's outfit to the 1980 psychological horror film The Shining and fictional superheroine Sailor Moon, respectively.

Background and composition

Sorana has left her native country of Romania to pursue a musical career and relocated to London and then Los Angeles. Her work as a songwriter includes the commercially successful singles "Takeaway" (2019) by the Chainsmokers, Illenium and Lennon Stella, "OMG What's Happening" (2020) by Ava Max and "Heartbreak Anthem" (2021) by Galantis, Guetta and Little Mix. Furthermore, Sorana has also provided features for artists such as Alan Walker on "Lost Control" (2018). 

"Redrum", Sorana's debut single under Atlantic Records, was released for digital download and streaming on 20 January 2022, in collaboration with fellow lead artist Guetta. It was written by Sorana and 15 others, including Jeffrey Bhasker, Mikkel Cox, Guetta, Malik Jones, Mr Hudson, Scott Mescudi, Giorgio Tuinfort, Kanye West and Ernest Wilson, while the production was handled by Toby Green, Guetta and Cox. West personally approved an interpolation of the refrain of his 2008 song "Heartless" in "Redrum", leading to him, Jones, Mescudi and Wilson receiving credits. "Redrum", the song's title, is a palindrome for "Murder" that originates from a scene in the 1980 psychological horror film The Shining; an alternative stylization is "redruM". Musically, "Redrum" is a dance-pop track backed by "Guetta's signature driving bass lines and huge synths". Regarding its meaning, Sorana stated:

On 4 February 2022, a MistaJam remix of "Redrum" was released. Nicole Pepe of We Rave You thought that it "breathes a new life into the original by adding more hypnotic and spacey synths, and an edgy faster tempo"; she further noticed "a darker underlying tone" and "early 2000's EDM vibes". Robin Schulz also issued a remix on 16 February 2022, with Dancing Astronaut's Rachel Narozniak labelling it as a "beat-driven take on [the] original [that] maintains the easy-listening appeal present [...] but picks up the pace just slightly".

Reception
Upon release, "Redrum" was met with positive reviews from music critics. We Rave You's Ellie Mullins thought that "the heartbreak [in the song's lyrics] is perfectly conveyed through the passion of [Sorana's] stunning vocals. Completing the track and putting the cherry on top, Guetta creates a passionate and intricate soundscape that allows for [her] talents to shine to their fullest ability." Nassim Aziki, writing for Fun Radio, noticed a "powerful chorus" and a "terribly beautiful voice" resembling that of Sia. 

Another editor from Fun Radio highlighted the song's similarities to "Dangerous" (2014) and "Flames" (2018) from Guetta's catalogue. A writer of CelebMix commended the song, writing that it "beautifully showcases Sorana's knack for catchy hooks and artful storytelling as well as [...] Guetta's ability to craft sleek productions. This one's made to be played over and over again and will get stuck in your head for a while". Commercially, "Redrum" attained modest peaks in several countries, including number ten in Bulgaria, number 17 in the Commonwealth of Independent States (CIS), number 26 in Croatia, number 18 in the Netherlands and number 13 in Russia.

Music video
An accompanying music video was uploaded to Guetta's YouTube channel on 20 January 2022. It was directed by Andra Marta, Alexandru Mureșan and Cristina Poszet, while Mureșan was also hired as the director of photography and Nicoleta Darabană as Sorana's double. The clip opens with a fuzzy television screen displaying the song's title. Sorana is seen lying next to it on the floor of a room with pulsating lights and pop art of Guetta; as she nears the television, she is being grabbed into it by her mouth by a clone of herself. Sorana subsequently finds herself in a hallway of a 1980s-styled hotel along with her clone, who has a white outfit, neon blue braids and long nails while carrying a knife in her hands that are covered by a pink liquid. The clone proceeds into chasing Sorana through the hallway which displays further portraits of Guetta. Although Sorana runs away and hides, they eventually meet and fight on top of each other. The singer is then portrayed in a bathtub with pink liquid wherein she drowns, before the video ends with a shot of Sorana in the room shown at the beginning; her hands and outfit are covered with the liquid. 

Observers likened the hotel shown during the clip to The Shining and Sorana's appearance to that of the fictional superheroine Sailor Moon. While Major called the video "dark and twisted", Aziki thought the singer's outfit is "very extravagant". Rachel Kupfer, writing for EDM.com, opined that the clone was the "murderous new girlfriend" of Sorana's ex and further stated that the "cotton candy-colored" visual had "futuristic, alien-like fashion and [...] dramatics [that] are off the charts". An editor of CelebMix spoke highly of the clip, naming it "probably one of the most aesthetically-pleasing music videos we have seen over the last couple of months".

Track listing
Official versions
"Redrum" – 2:52
"Redrum" (MistaJam Remix) – 3:03
"Redrum" (Robin Schulz Remix) – 2:56

Credits and personnel
Credits adapted from Spotify and YouTube.

Songwriting and technical credits

Jeffrey Bhaskersongwriter
Ron Cabiltessample clearance
Pedro Callonivocal mix
Mikkel Coxsongwriter, producer 
Scott Desmaraismix engineer assistant
Thomas Eriksensongwriter
Robin Florentmix engineer assistant
Tobias Frederiksensongwriter
Chris Gallandmix engineer
Toby Greenproducer
David Guettasongwriter, producer 
Jeremie Inhabermix engineer assistant
Malik Jonessongwriter
Mr Hudsonsongwriter
Julia Karlssonsongwriter
Michelle Mancinimastering
Manny Marroquinmixing
Scott Mescudisongwriter
Benjamin McIldowiesongwriter
Sorana Păcurarvocals, songwriter
Madalin Roșioruvocal engineering
Anton Rundbergsongwriter 
Rollo Spreckleysongwriter
Giorgio Tuinfortsongwriter 
Kanye Westsongwriter
Ernest Wilsonsongwriter
Danny Zooksample clearance

Music video credits

Dragoș Constantinestyling, costume design
Nicoleta Darabanăbody double
Ilina Dumitruhair stylist
Malvina Isfanmake-up artist
Andra Martadirector, edit
Alexandru Mureșandirector, director of photography, color grading
Hilke Muslimstyling, costume design
Trevor Joseph Newtonvideo commissioner
Cristina Poszetdirector
Cătălina Stoicanail artist

Charts

Weekly charts

Year-end charts

Release history

Notes

References

2022 singles
2022 songs
Sorana (singer) songs
David Guetta songs
Song recordings produced by David Guetta
Songs written by Anton Rundberg
Songs written by David Guetta
Songs written by Jeff Bhasker
Songs written by Kanye West
Songs written by Kid Cudi
Songs written by Malik Yusef
Songs written by Mr Hudson
Songs written by No I.D.
Songs written by Sorana (singer)